Esbo Bollklubb (EBK) was founded in 1940 as a football club for the city of Espoo in Finland. In the past the club participated in more sports, but in recent years has specialised in football. EBK's men's team plays in Kolmonen Section 1 of Helsinki and Uusimaa. At its pinnacle the men's team played in the Kakkonen [Third level] in the years 1989–91. The women's team played in women's SM-series in 1993 and 1994. EBK caters for a range of age groups for boys and girls teams.

The club's greatest competitive success was in the Finnish Cup in 1995. EBK is Espoo's oldest team.

Season to season
{|
|valign="top" width=0%|

2020 season
For the 2020 season EBK competed in Section 1 (Lohko 1) of the Kolmonen administered by the Uusimaa SPL. This is the fourth highest tier in the Finnish football system. In 2009, EBK finished in 2nd position in Section 1 of the Kolmonen.

EBK's presidents

References

External links
Official website
Suomen Cup
EBK Facebook
Xhevdet Gela at EBK's homepage

Football clubs in Finland
Sport in Espoo
1940 establishments in Finland